Jaleleddine Touati (born 12 July 1982) is a Tunisian handball player, playing for Dunkerque. He competed for the Tunisian national team at the 2012 Summer Olympics in London, where the Tunisian team reached the quarterfinals.

References

1982 births
Living people
Sportspeople from Tunis
Tunisian male handball players
Olympic handball players of Tunisia
Handball players at the 2012 Summer Olympics
Competitors at the 2009 Mediterranean Games
Mediterranean Games bronze medalists for Tunisia
Mediterranean Games medalists in handball
21st-century Tunisian people
20th-century Tunisian people